The Sabres of Paradise were a British electronic music group from London. They consisted of Andrew Weatherall, Jagz Kooner, and Gary Burns.

History
The Sabres of Paradise were formed in London, England in 1992. Andrew Weatherall formed the group with engineers Jagz Kooner and Gary Burns and became responsible for the Sabresonic warehouse raves. The group's debut studio album, Sabresonic, was released in 1993. It peaked at number 29 on the UK Albums Chart. NME named it the 23rd best album of 1993. The group released Haunted Dancehall in 1994. It peaked at number 57 on the UK Albums Chart. NME named it the 47th best album of 1994. It was included on the list of 1001 Albums You Must Hear Before You Die. The group released Sabresonic II in 1995. It peaked at number 88 on the UK Albums Chart. 

The group dissolved in 1995. Weatherall went on to form Two Lone Swordsmen with Keith Tenniswood while Kooner and Burns carried on working together with The Aloof.

Style and influences
In 2011, the then head of music at BBC Radio 1, Christopher Price, highlighted the In the Nursery remix of "Haunted Dancehall" as the style of music that would be played on pop radio to prepare audiences before cutting to an announcement of major news such as the death of the Queen.

Discography

Studio albums
 Sabresonic (Warp, 1993)
 Haunted Dancehall (Warp, 1994)
 Sabresonic II (Warp, 1995)

Compilation albums
 Septic Cuts (Sabres of Paradise, 1994)
 Deep Cuts (Sabres of Paradise, 1994)
 Versus (Warp, 1995)

Singles
 "Smokebelch II" (Warp, 1993)
 "United" (Sabres of Paradise, 1993)
 "Theme" (Sabres of Paradise, 1994)
 "Wilmot" (Warp, 1994)
 "Wilmot II" (Warp, 1994)
 "Jam J" (Fontana Records, 1994) 
 "Haunted Dancehall (As Performed by In the Nursery)" (Warp, 1995)
 "Duke of Earlsfield (LFO Mix)" / "Bubble & Slide (Nightmares on Wax Mix)" (Warp, 1995)
 "Tow Truck (Chemical Brothers Mix)" / "Tow Truck (Depth Charge Mix)" (Warp, 1995)
 "Ysaebud" (Special Emissions, 1997)
 "Lick Wid Nit Wit" (Elastic Dreams, 2018)

References

External links
 
 

British electronic music groups
Musical groups established in 1992
Musical groups disestablished in 1995
Musical groups from London
Warp (record label) artists